Qinorapala is a genus of butterflies in the family Lycaenidae. The single species Qinorapala qinlingana Chou & Wang, 1995 is endemic to China.

Deudorigini
Lycaenidae genera